Peedu is a village in Järva Parish, Järva County in northern-central Estonia.

References

 

Villages in Järva County